The 72 stone steps leading up to the entrance of the Philadelphia Museum of Art, in Philadelphia, Pennsylvania, have become known as the "Rocky Steps" as a result of a scene from the 1976 film Rocky.  Tourists often mimic Rocky's famous climb, a metaphor for an underdog or an everyman rising to a challenge. A bronze Rocky statue was briefly situated at the top of the steps for the filming of Rocky III. This statue, now located at the bottom right of the steps, is a popular photo opportunity for visitors. The top of the steps offers a commanding view of Eakins Oval, the Benjamin Franklin Parkway, and Philadelphia City Hall.

In 2006, Rocky creator Sylvester Stallone recounted that the genesis of the iconic scene occurred when the 1976 film crew, bound by a tight budget, identified the steps one night while searching for filming locations around the city. Stallone first thought Rocky should carry his dog Butkus up the steps, but the big bull mastiff proved too heavy for the scene to work. Still, the view from the top of the stairs inspired him to reshoot the scene without the dog. In the 2006 film Rocky Balboa, Rocky lifts his dog Punchy when he reaches the top of the steps. The closing credits of Rocky Balboa show a montage of dozens of people running up the steps.

This scene was one of the first uses in a major film of the Steadicam, a stabilized camera mount that allows its operator to walk and even climb steps while smoothly filming.

Boxer Joe Frazier, who has a paid cameo as himself later in the film, claims that the scene is based in his training, even if he was not paid for it.

Bronze Rocky statue

Before Rocky III, released in 1982, Stallone commissioned A. Thomas Schomberg to create a bronze statue of Rocky. Three 2-ton, -tall copies were to be cast. One was installed atop the steps for the filming of Rocky III, and was ultimately relocated to the bottom of the steps. The second Rocky was in the San Diego Hall of Champions Sports Museum in San Diego, California, until it closed in 2017. The statue was then put up for auction and purchased by an anonymous buyer who was later revealed to be Sylvester Stallone himself.

In 2006, Schomberg realized the casting mold for the statue was beginning to decay, and the third and final edition of the statue was cast in bronze and put up for auction on eBay three separate times between 2002 and 2005, with a starting bid of US$5,000,000, then US$3,000,000, and finally US$1,000,000 to raise funds for the International Institute for Sport and Olympic History. It is currently exhibited at the Schomberg Studios Gallery in Denver, Colorado.

After filming was complete, a debate arose between the Art Museum and Philadelphia's Art Commission over the meaning of "art". City officials, who argued that the Rocky statue was not "art" but a "movie prop", eventually moved it to the front of the Philadelphia Spectrum.

It was later returned to the Art Museum for the filming of Rocky V, then brought back to the Spectrum. The statue was replaced with a bronze inlay of Converse sneaker footprints with the name "Rocky" above them.

On September 8, 2006, the Rocky statue was returned to the Art Museum and placed on a pedestal in a grassy area near the foot of the steps to the right of the Museum. The unveiling ceremony included live music, the debut of the first full trailer for Rocky Balboa, and a free showing of the first Rocky movie. At the ceremony, Philadelphia Mayor John Street said that the steps were one of Philly's biggest tourist attractions, and that Stallone, a native New Yorker, had become "the city's favorite adopted son".

In popular culture

The Rocky film scene has become a cultural icon. Many tourists visit the steps to recreate the scene themselves. E! Channel ranked it No. 13 in its 101 Most Awesome Moments in Entertainment. During the 1996 Olympic Torch Relay, Philadelphia native Dawn Staley was chosen to run up the museum steps. The steps are the backdrop for the annual Independence Day celebration, and have often been featured in large concerts such as Live 8. Two journalists from the Philadelphia Inquirer spent a year interviewing people who ran the steps, and published a book in 1996 called Rocky Stories: Tales of Love, Hope, and Happiness at America's Most Famous Steps.

Sports
The 2017 NFL Draft was held from the steps, the first time the NFL draft was held outdoors.

The Rocky steps has been the subject of pregame dress-up by fans right before their NFL team plays the Philadelphia Eagles.  As an example, in the days leading up to the 2017-18 NFC Championship, Minnesota Vikings fans were seen performing the "Skol!" chant around various Philadelphia landmarks, including the Philadelphia Museum of Art, where they also adorned the statue of Rocky with Vikings colors. Despite being underdogs as they fielded backup quarterback Nick Foles, the Eagles defeated the visiting Vikings, 38–7, which was nicknamed the "Minneapolis Massacre", thus denying the Vikings the opportunity to become the first team to play in a Super Bowl in its home stadium. In the run-up to Super Bowl LVII, the Kansas City Chiefs' Travis Kelce warned "Chiefs, do not touch the f---ing Rocky memorial!"<

Homages
The scene has inspired homages and parodies since Rocky was released in 1976.
 In The Simpsons episode "I'm Spelling as Fast as I Can", Lisa Simpson runs up a flight of stairs wearing a tracksuit similar to Rocky's.
 In Chowder episode "The Broken Part", during his training, the titular character runs up a stairs with a boxer's statue at the top of them.
 In the film In Her Shoes, Toni Collette's character, Rose Feller, runs up the steps with four dogs.
 On the episode, "The Philadelphia Story", of The Fresh Prince of Bel-Air, the character Will, while back in Philly, trains for a big fight against a former neighborhood bully; the training ends with Will running up the steps to "Gonna Fly Now", and celebrating and passing out, where a passer-by steals his wallet and hat.
 In the Eddie Murphy movie The Nutty Professor, Sherman Klump runs up the steps to one of his college's buildings, parodying the scene.
 Participants in Philadelphia's monthly Critical Mass bike ride generally finish up by cycling to the Rocky Steps, hoisting their bicycles, running up the steps, then lifting their bikes above their heads.
 In a Reebok campaign, Allen Iverson, then with the Philadelphia 76ers, ran up the steps while dribbling a basketball.
 In the Boy Meets World episode, "The Witches of Pennbrook" Eric says that he and Jack are going to run up the steps and had been planning it for months.
 In the opening episode of the 2005 boxing reality television series The Contender (which featured and was executive produced by Stallone), Philadelphia native Najai Turpin ran up the steps.
In the film Shazam!, Billy Batson/Shazam and Freddy Freeman sit on the steps, with Billy/Shazam commenting, "Man, it's a pretty sick view. I totally get why Rocky was training so hard to get up here." Later on in the film, Shazam puts on a show for people atop the same steps, firing bolts of lightning to the beat of "Eye of the Tiger" by Survivor, which also served as the theme song to Rocky III.

See also
 Rocky statue in Žitište
 Potemkin Stairs
 Exorcist steps
 Joker Stairs
 The Music Box Steps

References

External links
 https://www.rockystatue.com
 Schomberg Studios

Landmarks in Philadelphia
Buildings and structures in Philadelphia
Culture of Philadelphia
Steps
Stairways in the United States
Art gallery districts
Museums in popular culture
Philadelphia Museum of Art
Tourist attractions in Philadelphia
Fairmount, Philadelphia
Boxing in art